Depot Creek Falls is a -high waterfall in the North Cascades National Park, Whatcom County, Washington.

The falls occur where Depot Creek drops over a headwall. The creek starts off by plunging . Spray at the falls' base is immense.

Reaching the falls is challenging. This is one reason the falls are seldom visited.

Nearby waterfalls
Depot Valley Falls (400 ft)
Lake Fork Falls (400 ft)
Spickard Falls (600 ft)
Silver Lake Falls (2,128 ft)

References

Waterfalls of Washington (state)
North Cascades of Washington (state)
Waterfalls of Whatcom County, Washington
North Cascades National Park
Cascade waterfalls